Łuków  is a village in the administrative district of Gmina Gaszowice, within Rybnik County, Silesian Voivodeship, in southern Poland.

The village has a population of 730.

References

Villages in Rybnik County